The Islamic Azad University,Yadegar Emam (Shahr-e-Rey) Branch is situated in southern Tehran Province in Iran. It initially began working in Ray,iran, the oldest part of Tehran.

Campuses
The Yadegar Emam branch of Islamic Azad University has two large campuses: 
Yadegar-Imam campus which has engineering, geography, and graduate studies faculties
Safayeh campus which is dedicated to the social sciences faculty

External links
Official Website  
Graduated Students' Forum of Electrical Engineering - Telecommunication
Azad News Agency

Educational institutions established in 1982
shahr rey|Ray
Education in Tehran Province
Buildings and structures in Tehran Province
1982 establishments in Iran